Button Gwinnett (March 3, 1735 – May 19, 1777) was a British-born American Founding Father who, as a representative of Georgia to the Continental Congress, was one of the signers (first signature on the left) of the United States Declaration of Independence. Gwinnett was also, briefly, the provisional president of Georgia in 1777, and Gwinnett County (now a major suburb of metropolitan Atlanta) was named for him. He was named in honor of his mother’s cousin, Barbara Button, who became his godmother.  Gwinnett was killed in a duel by rival Lachlan McIntosh following a dispute after a failed invasion of East Florida.

Early life and education

Gwinnett was born in 1735 in the parish of Down Hatherley in the county of Gloucestershire, England, to a Welsh father, the Reverend Samuel Gwinnett, (Gwinnett deriving from the Welsh kingdom of Gwynedd) and his wife, Anne. He was the third of his parents' seven children, born after his older sister Anna Maria and his older brother Samuel. There are conflicting reports as to his exact birthdate, but he was baptized in St Catherine's Church in Gloucester on April 10, 1735. It is believed that he attended the College School, held in Gloucester Cathedral (now called The King's School) as did his older brother, but there is no surviving evidence to substantiate this.  He started his career apprenticed to his uncle William Gwinnett, a greengrocer in Gloucester, then moved to Wolverhampton in Staffordshire in 1754 after obtaining a further apprenticeship with an ironmonger there named John Weston Smith. On 19 April 1757 he married Ann Bourne, daughter of a greengrocer, at St. Peter's Church, Wolverhampton. In 1762, the couple, who parented three daughters, departed Wolverhampton and emigrated to America.

Gwinnett's business activities took him from Newfoundland to Jamaica. Never very successful, he moved to Savannah, Georgia in 1765, and opened a store. When that venture failed, he bought (on credit) St. Catherine's Island, as well as a large number of enslaved people, in order to attempt to become a planter. Though his planting activities were also unsuccessful, he did make a name for himself in local politics and was elected to the Provincial Assembly.

Political career
Gwinnett did not become a strong advocate of colonial rights until 1775, when St. John's Parish, which encompassed his lands, threatened to secede from Georgia because of the colony's conservative response to the events of the times. During his tenure in the Assembly, Gwinnett's chief rival was Lachlan McIntosh, and Lyman Hall was his closest ally.

Gwinnett was appointed to represent Georgia at the Continental Congress, where he voted in favor of the Declaration of Independence, adopted by Congress on July 2, 1776. He signed the famous parchment copy on August 2, 1776. After signing the Declaration, he was accompanied as far as Virginia by Carter Braxton, another of the signers, carrying a proposed state constitution drawn up by John Adams. During his service in the Continental Congress, Gwinnett was a candidate for a brigadier general position to lead the 1st Regiment in the Continental Army but lost out to McIntosh.  The loss of the position to his rival embittered Gwinnett greatly.

Gwinnett served in the Georgia state legislature, and in 1777 he wrote the original draft of Georgia's first state constitution. He became Speaker of the Georgia Assembly, a position he held until the death of the President (Governor) of Georgia Archibald Bulloch. Gwinnett was elevated to the vacated position by the Assembly's Executive Council. In this position, he sought to undermine the leadership of McIntosh. Tensions between Gwinnett and McIntosh reached a boiling point when the General Assembly voted to approve Gwinnett's attack on British Florida in April 1777.

Death
As acting Delegate of the Congress from Georgia and commander-in-chief of Georgia's military, Gwinnett was the superior of his rival McIntosh. Gwinnett had McIntosh's brother arrested and charged with treason. He also ordered McIntosh to lead an invasion of British-controlled East Florida, which failed. Gwinnett and McIntosh blamed each other for the defeat, and McIntosh publicly called Gwinnett "a scoundrel and lying rascal". Gwinnett then challenged McIntosh to a duel, which they fought on May 16, 1777, at a plantation owned by deposed Royal Governor James Wright. The two men exchanged pistol shots at twelve paces, and both were wounded. Gwinnett died of his wounds on May 19, 1777 and is believed to have been buried in Savannah's Colonial Park Cemetery. McIntosh, although wounded, recovered and went on to live until 1806. He was not charged in connection with Gwinnett's death.

Legacy
Gwinnett's autograph is highly sought by collectors as a result of a combination of the desire by many top collectors to acquire a complete set of autographs by all 56 signers of the U.S. Declaration of Independence, and the extreme rarity of the Gwinnett signature; there are 51 known examples, since Gwinnett was fairly obscure prior to signing the Declaration and died shortly afterward. Only ten of those are in private hands. The 1953 Isaac Asimov short story "Button, Button" concerns an attempt to obtain a genuine (and therefore valuable) signature of Gwinnett by means of a device that can move objects through time.

Gwinnett County, Georgia, a suburban county outside Atlanta, is named after him and he is one of the three Georgia signers of the Declaration of Independence honored with the Signers Monument in Augusta.

See also

 Memorial to the 56 Signers of the Declaration of Independence
 List of U.S. state governors born outside the United States

References

External links
 
 Biography of   Button Gwinnett 
 Georgia Signers of the Declaration of Independence
 New Georgia Encyclopedia
 Biography by Rev. Charles A. Goodrich, 1856
 
 Button Gwinnett historical marker

1735 births
1777 deaths
Founding Fathers of the United States
18th-century American politicians
American Congregationalists
American politicians killed in duels
American Revolutionary War deaths
American slave owners
Deaths by firearm in Georgia (U.S. state)
British emigrants to the Thirteen Colonies
Continental Congressmen from Georgia (U.S. state)
Georgia (U.S. state) Independents
Governors of Georgia (U.S. state)
Gwinnett County, Georgia
Independent state governors of the United States
People educated at the King's School, Gloucester
People from the Borough of Tewkesbury
People from Wolverhampton
People of Georgia (U.S. state) in the American Revolution
Politicians from Savannah, Georgia
Signers of the United States Declaration of Independence
Welsh emigrants to the United States